Megaro Moussikis is a station on the Athens Metro, located just outside the Athens Concert Hall on Vassilissis Sophias Ave. The U.S. Embassy, as well as the hospitals "Alexandra", "Areteion", "NIMITS" and "Eginition", are close to the station.

Station layout

Cultural works
 Panagiotis Fidakis's Bambouzina, consisting of birds perching on a staff, is at the ticket hall level.

References

Athens Metro stations
Railway stations opened in 2000
2000 establishments in Greece